The Distillers is the debut release and first 7" EP released by the Los Angeles punk rock band the Distillers. 

It was released in 1999 on Hellcat Records.  The versions on the 7" are different from those on the self-titled LP.  The 7" also included a free sticker. All of the tracks on the EP were written by Distillers frontwoman Brody Dalle.

Track listing
Side A
"Old Scratch"
"L.A. Girl"

Side B
"Colossus U.S.A."
"Blackheart"

Personnel
Brody Dalle (then known as Brody Armstrong) - vocals, guitar
Kim-i-la (Kim Fuelleman) - bass, vocals 
Matt Young - drums
Rose "Casper" Mazolla - Guitar

1999 debut EPs
The Distillers albums